The Moti Masjid is a white marble mosque inside the Red Fort complex in Delhi, India. Located to the west of the Hammam and close to the Diwan-i-Khas, it was built by the Mughal emperor Aurangzeb from 1659-1660.

History 
The mosque was built by the Mughal emperor Aurangzeb at the Red Fort complex in Delhi, India, from 1659-1660 for his 2nd wife Nawab Bai. The mosque was also used by the ladies of the Zenana. The mosque was constructed at a cost of Rs. 160,000.

The prayer hall has three arches, and it is divided into two aisles. It is surmounted with three bulbous domes, which were originally covered in gilded copper. The gilded copper was probably lost after the Indian rebellion of 1857.

Architecture 
The outer walls are oriented in symmetry with the outer walls of the fort, while the inner walls are at a slightly different orientation to align with the location of Mecca. The eastern door is provided with copper-plated leaves.

The mosque is plastered in white on the outside. Inside is the white marble courtyard and a prayer hall, which stands on a higher level than the courtyard. The floor of the prayer-hall is inlaid with outlines of small carpets for prayers (musalla) in black marble. In the middle of the courtyard is a small, square ablution fountain. The courtyard measures 40 x 35 feet.

Another small mosque by the same name was built for private prayer by  Aurangzeb's son, the Mughal emperor Bahadur Shah I (r. 1707-1712), close to the Ajmere Gate of the Dargah of Sufi saint Qutbuddin Bakhtiar Kaki, which is located in Mehrauli at the Jahaz Mahal. It is an imitation of the one inside the Red Fort.

Gallery

References

External links 

Marble buildings
Mosques in Delhi
Red Fort
1660 establishments in the Mughal Empire
Mughal mosques
Mosques completed in the 1660s
Monuments of National Importance in Delhi